Heydenia is a genus of wasps in the family Pteromalidae.

Species 
 Heydenia angularicoxa Yang
 Heydenia bambeyi Risbec
 Heydenia burgeoni (Risbec)
 Heydenia coomoni Xiao & Huang
 Heydenia cristatipennis (Girault)
 Heydenia gibsoni Sureshan
 Heydenia indica Narendran
 Heydenia longicollis (Cameron)
 Heydenia madagascariensis (Hedqvist)
 Heydenia mateui (Hedqvist)
 Heydenia natalensis (Westwood)
 Heydenia ornata (Risbec)
 Heydenia pretiosa Förster
 Heydenia scolyti Yang
 Heydenia seyrigi (Risbec)
 Heydenia testacea Yang
 Heydenia trinodis Boucek
 Heydenia tuberculata Sureshan
 Heydenia unica Cook & Davis

References

External links 
 

Pteromalidae
Hymenoptera genera